was a terminal railway station on the Towada Kankō Electric Railway Line located in the city of Towada, Aomori Prefecture, Japan. It was 13.7 rail kilometers from the opposite terminus of the Towada Kankō Electric Railway Line at Misawa Station.

History
It was renamed to its present name on May 15, 1969. The station was completely rebuilt on October 28, 1985 with the new station incorporating the headquarters of the Towada Kankō Electric Railway, and the former station used for freight operations only. However, the line discontinued its freight operations in 1986 and the old station was demolished in 2005. In March 2007, a new terminal building, including a bank, post office, real estate office and supermarket was inaugurated.

The station was closed when the Towada Kankō Electric Railway Line was discontinued on April 1, 2012.

Lines
Towada Kankō Electric Railway
Towada Kankō Electric Railway Line

Station layout
Towadashi Station had one platform serving one track.

Platforms

Adjacent stations

See also
 List of Railway Stations in Japan

References
 Harris, Ken and Clarke, Jackie. Jane's World Railways 2008-2009. Jane's Information Group (2008).

External links
Totetsu home page 
location map

Railway stations in Japan opened in 1932
Railway stations in Aomori Prefecture
Railway stations closed in 2012
Defunct railway stations in Japan